Raed Bko (born 8 July 1987) is a Syrian football player who plays as a defender for Panelefsiniakos F.C. in the Delta Ethniki.

Bko previously played for Al-Horriya in the Syrian League.

References

1987 births
Kurdish sportspeople
Living people
Syrian footballers
Syrian expatriate footballers
Syrian Kurdish people
Egaleo F.C. players
Expatriate footballers in Greece
Panelefsiniakos F.C. players
Association football defenders
Syrian Premier League players